Chromodorididae, or chromodorids,  are a taxonomic family of colourful, sea slugs; dorid nudibranchs, marine gastropod mollusks in the superfamily Doridoidea.   “Chromodorid nudibranchs are among the most gorgeously coloured of all animals.” The over 360 described species are primarily found in tropical and subtropical waters, as members of coral reef communities, specifically associated with their sponge prey. The chromodorids are the most speciose family of opisthobranchs. They range in size from <10mm to over 30 cm, although most species are approximately 15–30 mm in size.

Although, they have a worldwide distribution, most species are found in the Indo-Pacific region. A scientific paper published in 2007, found the most widespread chromodorid genera,  (Mexichromis, Chromodoris,  Glossodoris and Hypselodoris) to be paraphyletic or polyphyletic.

The family Cadlinidae Bergh, 1891 has been considered a synonym of the Chromodorididae." Research by R.F. Johnson in 2011   has shown that Cadlina does not belong to the family Chromodorididae. She has therefore brought back the name Cadlinidae from synonymy with Chromodorididae. The chromodorid nudibranchs without Cadlina are now monophyletic and turn out to be a possible sister to the family Actinocyclidae. Cadlina and Aldisa are the only two genera currently classified in the Cadlinidae.

A comprehensive phylogeny of the chromodorid nudibranchs found every one of the 14 traditional chromodorid genera were either non-monophyletic, or rendered another genus paraphyletic. Additionally, both the monotypic genera Verconia and Diversidoris are nested within clades. The authors presented a new classification of the chromodorid nudibranchs, which used molecular data to untangle evolutionary relationships and at the same time retains a historical connection to traditional systematics by using generic names attached to type species as clade names. All Chromodorid nudibranchs feed on sponges.

Genera
Genera within the family Chromodorididae include:
 Ardeadoris  Rudman, 1984 
 Berlanguella Ortea, Bacallado & Valdés, 1992 (although this has not been properly investigated)
 Cadlinella Thiele, 1931
 Ceratosoma  J. E. Gray and M. E. Gray, 1850 
 Chromodoris Alder and Hancock, 1855  - the type genus
 Diversidoris  Rudman, 1987 
 Doriprismatica d'Orbigny, 1839
 Durvilledoris  Rudman, 1984 
 Felimare Ev. Marcus & Er. Marcus, 1967
 Felimida Marcus, 1971
 Glossodoris Ehrenberg, 1831
 Goniobranchus Pease, 1866
 Hypselodoris Stimpson, 1855
 Mexichromis Bertsch, 1977
 Miamira Bergh, 1874
 Thorunna  Bergh, 1878 
 Tyrinna  Bergh, 1898 
 Verconia Pruvot-Fol, 1931  - synonym: Noumea Risbec, 1928 
 Genera brought into synonymy 
 Actinodoris Ehrenberg, 1831 : synonym of Chromodoris Alder & Hancock, 1855
 Babaina Odhner in Franc, 1968 : synonym of Thorunna Bergh, 1878
 Casella H. Adams & A. Adams, 1854 : synonym of Glossodoris Ehrenberg, 1831
 Chromolaichma Bertsch, 1977 : synonym of Glossodoris Ehrenberg, 1831
 Crepidodoris Pagenstecher, 1877 : synonym of Glossodoris Ehrenberg, 1831
 Digidentis  Rudman, 1984 : synonym of Thorunna
 Jeanrisbecia Franc, 1968 : synonym of Risbecia Odhner, 1934 synonym of Hypselodoris Stimpson, 1855
 Lissodoris Odhner, 1934 : synonym of Chromodoris Alder & Hancock, 1855
 Noumea (preoccupied by a beetle): synonym of Verconia
 Orodoris Bergh, 1875 : synonym of Ceratosoma Gray, 1850
 Pectenodoris Rudman, 1984 : synonym of Mexichromis
 Pterodoris Ehrenberg, 1831 : synonym of Hypselodoris Stimpson, 1855
 Risbecia  Odhner, 1934 : synonym of Hypselodoris
 Rosodoris Pruvot-Fol, 1954 : synonym of Glossodoris Ehrenberg, 1831

References